Greek National Road 1 (abbreviated as EO1) is the old single carriageway road connecting Athens with Thessaloniki and Evzonoi, the border crossing between Greece and North Macedonia. For most of its length, it has been replaced by the new A1 motorway.

Original route
According to the Government Gazette in 1963, the original alignment of EO1 ran from Athens to Evzoni and the international border with what was then Yugoslavia, via: Decelea, Sfendali (for Malakasa), Martino, Atalanti, Kamena Vourla, Thermopylae, Lamia, Stylida, Almyros, Velestino (for Volos), Larissa, Tempe, Katerini, Alexandreia, Chalkidona, Gefyra and Polykastro.

Present route
Today, the A1 motorway has absorbed most of EO1's original alignment, although the EO1 continues to run alongside most of the A1 for non-motorway traffic. However, there is a motorway-only gap west of Lake Yliki, requiring non-motorway traffic to detour via Thebes and Aliartos on the EO3. Additionally, the border crossing itself, north of Evzoni, is only open to motorway traffic.

Citations

1
Roads in Attica
Roads in Central Greece
Roads in Thessaly
Roads in Central Macedonia